The Huaca La Esmeralda is an archaeological building belonging to the Chimu culture, is located in the Peruvian city of Trujillo. It is estimated that the adobe construction was done during the first stage of development of the Chimu culture, in close link with the capital Chan Chan. It occupies an area of approximately 2,600 square meters.

Chimú shrine
It is said the Huaca La Esmeralda could have been the palace of a great Chimú lord of the Mansiche area. Its architecture has three terraces adorned with zoomorphic and geometric figures (diamonds) all in relief, has a fairly steep ramp that connects its two levels.

Huaca meaning ceremonial cup.  Huaca La Esmeralda translates as the ceremonial cup of Esmeralda.  With little archaeological study done at this site, it seems unclear as to who Esmeralda was and how it was given that name.

See also
Iperu, tourist information and assistance
Tourism in Peru
Huaca del Sol
Chan Chan
Huaca del Dragón

References

Further reading
Kubler, George. (1962). The Art and Architecture of Ancient America, Ringwood: Penguin Books Australia Ltd., pp. 247–274

External links 
 Location of Huaca Esmeralda in Trujillo city (Wikimapia)
 UNESCO World Heritage Center: Chan Chan
 History Channel Classroom: Chan Chan
 Chan Chan information 
 Chan Chan - Chimu's Desert City (Flash)
 Heavy Rains Threaten Ancient City in Northern Peru
 Archaeologists Restore High Adobe Walls in Ancient Chimu City of Chan Chan

Former populated places in Peru
Archaeological sites in Trujillo, Peru
Archaeological sites in Peru